Tierra Caliente music (música de Tierra Caliente in Spanish) is a genre of Regional Mexican music.

History
Tierra Caliente music originated in the late 1980s in Mexico's Tierra Caliente region of Michoacán. The genre was influenced by the Technobanda sound, essentially using the same instruments such as vocals, electric keyboards, electric bass, trumpets, trombones, saxophones and drums. Some bands also utilize accordions. Tierra Caliente emphasizes the electric keyboard, giving the genre its own signature keyboard riff. The genre's popularity was originally limited to the regions in Mexico it is named after, as well as among the Mexican population from said regions living in the United States, but starting in the mid-2000s, its popularity spread to other regions in Mexico, mainly in the country's central states, as well as the Mexican community from said regions residing in the United States.

Artists
Some of the most famous Tierra Caliente artists include the likes of La Dinastía de Tuzantla, Beto y sus Canarios, Los Pajaritos de Tacupa, Gerardo Díaz y su Gerarquía, Triny y La Leyenda, Josecito León y su Internacional Banda Roja, El Cejas y su Banda Fuego, Tierra Cali, Toño y Freddy, among others.

Styles
Styles of lyrical and instrumental songs performed in Tierra Caliente include rancheras, corridos, cumbias, charangas, ballads, boleros, sones, chilenas, polkas and waltzes.

References

Regional styles of Mexican music
Folk music genres
Mexican styles of music